Timothy Hugh Pallas (born 7 January 1960) is an Australian politician. He has been a Labor Party member of the Victorian Legislative Assembly since 2006, representing the electorate of Tarneit until 2014 and Werribee thereafter. He has served as Treasurer of Victoria in the Andrews Ministry since December 2014. Pallas previously served as Minister for Roads and Ports and Minister for Major Projects in the Brumby Ministry until 2010.

Early career

Political career
He first contested the open preselection for the federal seat of Melbourne Ports in 1998, but was defeated by Michael Danby.

In 2005, Pallas challenged incumbent backbencher Mary Gillett for preselection in the safe seat of Tarneit, and with Bracks' backing, was successful. He was easily elected at the 2006 state election, and was immediately appointed to Cabinet, being assigned the roads and ports portfolio.

In 2010, Pallas  called Formula One driver Lewis Hamilton a "dickhead" while launching a road safety initiative.  Hamilton had been caught by police engaging in an act of 'hoon driving' in a $160,000 Mercedes on the previous Friday night.

During his ministry, he implemented a number of measures to improve traffic flow on the major Victorian freeways including the Monash CityLink West Gate Upgrade. In February, he launched a $5 million study into traffic flow along Hoddle Street between CityLink and the Eastern Freeway. The study had been previously announced in the Victorian Transport Plan in 2008. In March, he approved a ban on trucks using the right-hand lane on busy sections of three-lane freeways. The RACV had campaigned for the ban for two years, attracting support from an "overwhelming 83% of motorists [it] surveyed".

Transferring to the electorate of Werribee following a boundary redistribution, Pallas was again successful at the 2014 Victorian state election and was appointed Treasurer in 2014 after the election of the Andrews Labor Government in November 2014. His first budget in May 2015 provided for the biggest spend on education in Victoria's history.

Pallas was additionally appointed Minister for Trade in June 2022.

He was elected for a fifth time at the 2022 Victorian state election.
Originally a member of Labor Right, Pallas defected to Labor Left along with six of his colleagues shortly after the 2022 Victorian state election; his defection meant that the positions of Premier, Deputy Premier and Treasurer were all held by members of Labor Left, and also ensured that Labor Left constituted a majority of the state Labor caucus.

Personal life
Pallas resides in Williamstown, approximately 20km away from his electorate of Werribee.

Pallas is married with two children, and is a supporter of the Werribee Tigers, the Western Bulldogs, the Melbourne Storm, Melbourne Victory and the Melbourne Vixens.

References

External links

Tim Pallas at re-member
Parliament of Victoria profile page
 Parliamentary voting record of Tim Pallas at Victorian Parliament Tracker

1960 births
Living people
Australian Labor Party members of the Parliament of Victoria
Labor Left politicians
Members of the Victorian Legislative Assembly
Treasurers of Victoria
Australian trade unionists
Australian National University alumni
21st-century Australian politicians
People from Newcastle, New South Wales